The Auraria Stakes is a South Australian Jockey Club Group 3 thoroughbred horse race for three year old fillies raced under Set Weights with penalties conditions, over a distance of 1800 metres at Morphettville Racecourse in Adelaide, Australia.  Total prize money for the race is A$127,250.

History
The race is named in honour of the horse Auraria, winner of the 1895 Melbourne Cup.
The race was inaugurated in 1944 by the Port Adelaide Racing Club, but since the club's race track Cheltenham Park Racecourse was unavailable during World War II the race was held at Morphettville Racecourse. The following year the race was run at Cheltenham.

Name
 1944–1998 - Auraria Stakes
 1999–2005 - Lakewood Stud Stakes
 2006–2010 - Auraria Stakes
2011–2020 - Schweppervescence Stakes
2021 - Auraria Stakes

Distance
 1944 - 1 mile (~1609 metres)
 1945 - 1 mile 9 yards (~1619 metres)
 1946–1959 -  furlongs (~1700 metres)
 1960–1972 -  miles (~1800 metres)
 1973–1984 –  1850 metres
 1985–1992 –  1800 metres
 1993 – 1809 metres 
 1994–2007 – 1800 metres
 2008–2009 – 1812 metres
 2010 onwards - 1800 metres

Grade
 1944–1979 - Principal Race
 1980 onwards - Group 3

Venue
 1944 - Morphettville
1945–1980 - Cheltenham Park
1981–1984 - Victoria Park
1985–1992 - Morphettville
1993–1996 - Victoria Park
1997–2001 - Cheltenham Park
 2002 - Morphettville
2003–2006 - Cheltenham Park
 2007 - Morphettville
 2008 - Cheltenham Park
2009 onwards - Morphettville

Winners

 2022 - My Whisper
 2021 - Tyche Goddess
 2020 - Silent Sovereign
 2019 - Mirette
 2018 - Sopressa
 2017 - Kenedna
 2016 - Silent Sedition
 2015 - Fitocracy
 2014 - Girl In Flight
 2013 - Global Balance
 2012 - Crucial
 2011 - Shylight
 2010 - Fairy Oak
 2009 - Princess Pulse
 2008 - Moment In Time
 2007 - Devil Moon
 2006 - Purde
 2005 - Overclock
 2004 - Dane Belltar
 2003 - Yvonne
 2002 - Clothilde
 2001 - Shelbourne Lass
 2000 - Grand Echezeaux
 1999 - Episode
 1998 - La Volta
 1997 - Exalted Miss
 1996 - Miss Margaret
 1995 - Tranquility
 1994 - Ascona
 1993 - Prime Again
 1992 - Gatherneaux
 1991 - Shavano Miss
 1990 - Alleged Lady
 1989 - Our Libra Lady
 1988 - Faithful Thought
 1987 - Flaming Wonder
 1986 - Miss Clipper
 1985 - Katikate
 1984 - Maintenon
 1983 - race not held
 1982 - Irish Heiress
 1981 - Sheraco
 1980 - Kaupo
 1979 - Hot Silk
 1978 - Laurente
 1977 - Pushy
 1976 - Marist Lady
 1975 - Yaraandoo
 1974 - Soma
 1973 - Hi Maralie
 1972 - Tressi
 1971 - Quseir
 1970 - Rain Amore
 1969 - Goliette
 1968 - Anthony's Daughter
 1967 - Kasota
 1966 - Lady Twilight
 1965 - Te Parae
 1964 - Nickel Shot
 1963 - Raindear
 1962 - Kirksite
 1961 - Shady Lass
 1960 - Serene Princess
 1959 - Mintaway
 1958 - Demeter
 1957 - Cherete
 1956 - Sleep Tight
 1955 - Wine Lover
 1954 - Everest Victory
 1953 - Nokomis
 1952 - Naetor
 1951 - Gay Comedy
 1950 - Carry Abbie
 1949 - Classee
 1948 - Could Be
 1947 - Gallery Girl
 1946 - Look 
 1945 - Maraken
 1944 - Chariot

See also
 List of Australian Group races
 Group races

References

Horse races in Australia
Sport in Adelaide